Ealhmund is an Anglo-Saxon male name. Notable people with the name include:

 Saint Alchmund of Hexham (died 780 or 781)
 King Ealhmund of Kent (ruled in 784)
 Saint Alchmund of Derby (died  800)
 Bishop Ealhmund of Winchester (died between 805 and 814)

Masculine given names